The 2012 Sporting Kansas City season was the seventeenth season of the team's existence in Major League Soccer and the second year played under the Sporting Kansas City moniker.

Overview

Preseason

Late 2011 
Preparations for the 2012 Major League Soccer season began only a day after the 2011 MLS Cup.  On November 21, 2011, Ryan Smith was traded to Chivas USA for 1st and 3rd round draft picks in the 2012 MLS Supplemental Draft.  Later the same day, all MLS teams were required to submit a list of 11 protected players for the 2011 MLS Expansion Draft to be held for the newly formed Montreal Impact.  The club chose to protect Davy Arnaud, Matt Besler, Teal Bunbury, Aurélien Collin, Roger Espinoza, Kei Kamara, Chance Myers, Jimmy Nielsen, Júlio César, C. J. Sapong, and Graham Zusi.

During the expansion draft on November 23, the Montreal Impact selected unprotected Sporting leftback Seth Sinovic.  Later the same day, Sporting KC waived Scott Lorenz, Miloš Stojčev, Craig Rocastle, and Jéferson.  The following Monday (November 28), Sporting traded team captain Davy Arnaud to the Montreal Impact for Sinovic and allocation money.  The club also announced that starting goalkeeper Jimmy Nielsen signed a contract extension through the 2013 season, with an option for the 2014 season.  On November 29, Sporting KC acquired Paulo Nagamura from Chivas USA for the 1st round supplemental draft pick that was part of the November 21 Ryan Smith trade.

In December, Sporting traded an international roster slot to the San Jose Earthquakes in exchange for two-time MLS All-Star and World Cup veteran winger Bobby Convey. Later in December, Sporting and Mexican club Cruz Azul agreed to a deal that would see Omar Bravo return to his home country.

Early 2012
Sporting Kansas City resumed its off-season transactions at the 2012 MLS SuperDraft and 2012 MLS Supplemental Draft. Generation adidas forward Dom Dwyer of South Florida was selected 16th overall in the SuperDraft, and he was joined by defender Cyprian Hedrick of Coastal Carolina in the second round. Between the two drafts, Sporting acquired the rights to local product Michael Thomas from the Earthquakes in exchange for a fourth-round supplemental pick. Thomas officially signed on January 18. On January 17, Sporting selected Shawn Singh, Pablo Punyed, Stefan Antonijevic, and Kyle Miller in the 2012 MLS Supplemental Draft. On January 19, yet another trade with the Earthquakes saw the acquisition of forward Jacob Peterson. On February 22, defender Daneil Cyrus was waived.

Squad

First team roster 
As of December 12, 2012.

Formation 

<div style="position: relative;">

{{Image label|x=0.25|y=0.12|scale=350|text=<span style="font-size:0.8em; color:Gold;">'Bunbury</span>}}

</div>

 Player movement 

 In 

 Out 

 Loans 

 In 

 Out 

 Major League Soccer 

 League table 

 Eastern Conference standings 

 Results summary 

 Match results 

 Preseason 

 2012 Disney Pro Soccer Classic 

 Exhibition Matches 

Regular season

 MLS Cup Playoffs Houston Dynamo won 2–1 on aggregate''

U.S. Open Cup

Friendly Matches

Recognition

AT&T Goal of the Week

MLS Save of the Week

MLS All-Stars 2012

2012 Team Awards

Miscellany

Allocation ranking 
Sporting Kansas City is in the #14 position in the MLS Allocation Ranking. The allocation ranking is the mechanism used to determine which MLS club has first priority to acquire a U.S. National Team player who signs with MLS after playing abroad, or a former MLS player who returns to the league after having gone to a club abroad for a transfer fee. A ranking can be traded, provided that part of the compensation received in return is another club's ranking.

International roster slots 
Sporting Kansas City has 7 MLS International Roster Slots for use in the 2012 season. Each club in Major League Soccer is allocated 8 international roster spots. Sporting Kansas City traded one slot to San Jose Earthquakes for the 2012 season only.

Future draft pick trades 
Future picks acquired: * 2013 MLS SuperDraft Round 2 pick acquired from New York Red Bulls.
Future picks traded: None.

MLS rights to other players 
It is believed that Sporting maintains the MLS rights to Herculez Gomez after the player declined a contract offer by the club and instead signed with a non-MLS side on a free transfer.

Notes 

Sporting Kansas City seasons
Sporting Kansas City
Sporting Kansas City
Sporting Kansas City
U.S. Open Cup champion seasons